Shei Atkins is an R&B singer-songwriter.

Her 2005 album The Lita Mae Show, released by Paid in Full Records, charted at number 47 on US Billboard's Top Gospel Albums chart, and also charted at number 86 on the US R&B Albums.

References

External links

Year of birth missing (living people)
Living people